Operation Musk Ox was an 81-day military exercise organized by the Canadian Army in 1946. It involved the 48 members of the Army driving 11 4½-ton Canadian-designed snowmobiles ("Penguins"). They were joined by three American observers in a smaller American-made snowmobile called a "Weasel" as well as an observer from the Royal Canadian Navy and a number of scientists. The Royal Canadian Air Force provided airdrops of supplies.

The main expedition, led by Patrick Douglas Baird, travelled , starting from Churchill, Manitoba, first to Baker Lake, Northwest Territories where the number of vehicles was reduced to ten. From there, the group travelled to Denmark Bay on Victoria Island, then south to Kugluktuk, Port Radium, Norman Wells, Fort Simpson, Fort Nelson, and Grande Prairie, and then by rail to Edmonton.

Two soldiers were killed in an accidental fire incident in Churchill, just before the main group departed. Many of those on the expedition suffered from carbon monoxide poisoning because wind blew exhaust inside the snowmobiles. On April 4, a Port Radium local drowned while trying to help rescue one of the Penguin snowmobiles which had fallen through the ice on Great Bear Lake.

The mission demonstrated that it was highly unlikely that Soviet forces would attempt an overland invasion of North America through the Arctic.

References

External links
Expedition Into The Arctic (1946), Newsreel on YouTube
The Canadian Army returns after military exercise Operation Muskox, Newsreel on YouTube
Obituary for Patrick Douglas Baird
Operation Musk Ox 1946, Exercise Musk Ox, article by Hugh. A. Halliday
TRACKS NORTH The Story of Exercise Muskox, John Lauder, author; P. Whitney Lackenbauer and Peter Kikkert, editors. Arctic Operational History Series, no.5 2018; Mulroney Institute, St. Francis Xavier University, 5005 Chapel Square, Antigonish, Nova Scotia, Canada. B2G 2W5; ISBN (pdf): 978-1-7753409-7-3
Snowmobile, Armoured, Canadian, Mk.1, A Survey of Army Research and Development, 1939-45, p.19-20 (14 Feb. 1955) (Canadian Army Headquarters Report No.73)

Northern Canada
Musk Ox
Canadian Army